Blackwood may refer to:

Botany
 African blackwood (Dalbergia melanoxylon), a timber tree of Africa
 African blackwood (Erythrophleum africanum),  (Peltophorum africanum) also Rhodesian blackwood, trees from Africa
 Australian blackwood (Senegalia modesta Syn.: Acacia modesta), a tree from India, Pakistan, Nepal and Himalaya
 Australian blackwood (Diospyros longibracteata), from Laos
 Australian or Tasmanian, Paluma blackwood (Acacia melanoxylon), a tree of eastern Australia
 Bombay, Malabar, Nilghiri or (East) Indian blackwood (Dalbergia latifolia), a timber tree of India
 Burmese Blackwood (Dalbergia cultrata, Dalbergia oliveri), trees from South China, Southeast Asia
 Cape blackwood (Diospyros whyteana), Southern East and South Africa, (Maytenus peduncularis), from South Africa
 Chinese blackwood, East African blackwood (Dalbergia melanoxylon), from Africa, India
 Indian blackwood (Hardwickia binata), from India
 Malabar blackwood (Dalbergia sissoides), from India, Indonesia 
 Acacia argyrodendron, a tree from Australia
 Acacia penninervis, a small tree or shrub of Australia
 Avicennia germinans, from Middle America to Northern South America, South United States, Africa
 Diospyros melanoxylon, from India
 Haematoxylum campechianum, from Central America

Entertainment
 Blackwood's Magazine, a British periodical printed between 1817 and 1980
 Blackwood (1976 film), a 1976 Canadian documentary film
 Blackwood (2013 film)
 Blackwoods (film), a 2002 psychological thriller film
 Blackwood convention, a bidding agreement in contract bridge
 The Blackwood Brothers, a southern gospel music quartet
 The Ghost of Blackwood Hall, one of the Nancy Drew series

Places

United States
 Blackwood, Georgia
 Blackwood, New Jersey
 Blackwood, North Carolina
 Blackwood, Virginia

United Kingdom
 Blackwood, Caerphilly, Wales
 Blackwood, Cumbernauld, North Lanarkshire, Scotland
 Blackwood, South Lanarkshire, Scotland

Australia
 Blackwood, South Australia, suburb of Adelaide, Australia
 Blackwood, Victoria, Australia

Other
 Blackwood (surname), a Scottish surname
 Blackwood (publishing house)
 Blackwood (whisky distillery)
 Blackwood National Park, in Charters Towers Region, Queensland, Australia
 Blackwood River, in Western Australia
 Blackwood-class frigate, named after Captain Henry Blackwood
 HMS Blackwood, named after Captain Henry Blackwood
 Lincoln Blackwood, an American luxury pickup truck manufactured by Lincoln

See also
 Black wood of grapevine, a bacterial disease